Karuppur is a village in the Kumbakonam taluk of Thanjavur district, Tamil Nadu, India.

Demographics 

As per the 2001 census, Karuppur had a total population of 1468 with 741 males and 727 females. The sex ratio was 981. The literacy rate was 86.4

References 

 

Villages in Thanjavur district